Wonder Woman is a 2009 American animated superhero film focusing on the superheroine of the same name. The plot of the film is loosely based on George Pérez's reboot of the character, specifically the Gods and Mortals arc that started the character's second volume in 1987. It is the fourth film of the DC Universe Animated Original Movies released by Warner Premiere and Warner Bros. Animation.

The film is directed by Lauren Montgomery, who directed the second act of The Death of Superman and did storyboard work for Justice League: The New Frontier, written by Gail Simone and Michael Jelenic. As with all previous releases in this line of films, it is produced by acclaimed DC Comics animation veteran Bruce Timm.

On August 11, 2015, Warner Home Video re-released the film on a combo pack, which includes a DVD and Blu-ray copy, a digital copy, and with the graphic novel it was based on.

Plot
In ancient times, the Amazons, a fierce race of warrior women, led by their Queen, Hippolyta, battle Ares, the god of war, and his army. During the battle, Hippolyta beheads her son Thrax, whom Ares forcibly conceived with her and who fought for his father. She is about to kill Ares, when Zeus stops her. Instead, Hera bounds his powers with magic bracers. They deprive him of his ability to draw power from the violence and death he can instigate. In compensation for their years of servitude to Ares, the Amazons are granted the island of Themyscira, where they remain eternally youthful and isolated from Man, holding Ares prisoner for all eternity. Hippolyta is also granted a daughter, Princess Diana, whom she shapes from the sand of the Themyscirian seashore and gives life with her own blood.

Over a millennium later, Diana is unsatisfied with her life on Themyscira and longs to explore the outside world. An American fighter pilot, Colonel Steve Trevor, is shot down in a dogfight and crash-lands his YF-23 fighter jet on the island. He then meets Diana, starting a fight in which he is defeated and taken to the Amazons. After interrogating him with the Amazons' golden lasso, Hippolyta decides he is not an enemy and as such, their tradition dictates that an emissary be tasked to ensure his safe return to his own country. Diana volunteers, but her mother argues that she hasn't enough experience in dealing with the dangers of the outside world. Diana is instead assigned to guard Ares' cell; her bookish but kind-hearted best friend Alexa offers to cover for her. Defying her mother, Diana covers her face with a helmet and participates in contests of strength, ultimately winning the right to escort Trevor home.

In the meantime, the Amazon Persephone, seduced by Ares, kills Alexa and releases him. Diana brings Trevor in his repaired and now invisible jet to New York City, where he volunteers to help Diana capture Ares. An investigation uncovers a pattern of violence created by Ares' presence. The pair goes out to a bar and, after some heavy drinking, Trevor makes a pass at Diana. They argue outside, but are attacked by the demigod Deimos. Diana subdues Deimos, who kills himself to avoid interrogation. His death leads Diana and Steve to a concealed gateway to the underworld guarded by members of a still-extant ancient cult of Ares.

Once they have arrived, Diana attempts to take Ares down, but he summons harpies that attack her, prompting Trevor to save her. Meanwhile, Ares performs a sacrificial ritual that opens a gate to the Underworld, where he persuades his uncle Hades to remove the bracers. Hades agrees, but does not tell his nephew that the ultimate cost of removing them would be his own death in combat. Later, Diana wakes up in a hospital, furious that Trevor saved her instead of stopping Ares. Trevor defends his actions, revealing how much he cares about her in the process.

Ares and his dark army attack Washington, D.C.; Trevor and Diana arrive to battle him and are soon joined by the Amazons. Ares manages to summon the Amazons long dead from the Underworld to fight their own sisters, but Alexa, a member of the undead host, reveals to her sister Artemis a chant which nullifies Ares's control. The undead then turn on Ares, but are destroyed by his powers; before passing on, Alexa makes peace with her older sister. Hippolyta kills Persephone in combat. With her dying breath, Persephone declares that by shutting the Amazons away from the world of Man, Hippolyta has denied them the happiness that comes with love and a family.

Meanwhile, Ares' influence reaches the President of the United States, who orders a nuclear missile against Themyscira, assuming the island is the source of the attack on Washington. This act of supreme aggression increases Ares's power, but Trevor takes the invisible jet and shoots down the missile just before it hits the island. After taking a brutal beating at Ares' hands, Diana finally outmaneuvers and beheads him. Trevor arrives back at the scene, Diana finally accepts him, and the two share a kiss. Ares is later condemned to the underworld to attend Hades as a slave.

On Themyscira, in memory of Alexa, Artemis takes up reading. Realizing that Diana misses both the outside world and Trevor, Hippolyta gives her the task of being a channel for "communication between men and women". Diana accepts and returns to New York, where she enjoys the company of Trevor and becomes the newly christened Wonder Woman.

Cast
 Keri Russell as Diana Prince / Wonder Woman
 Nathan Fillion as Steve Trevor
 Alfred Molina as Ares
 Rosario Dawson as Artemis
 Marg Helgenberger as Hera
 Oliver Platt as Hades
 Virginia Madsen as Hippolyta
 Skye Arens as Little Girl
 John DiMaggio as Deimos (credited), Homeless Man (uncredited)
 Julianne Grossman as Etta Candy
 Vicki Lewis as Persephone
 David McCallum as Zeus
 Jason Miller as Thrax (credited), Gang Leader (uncredited)
 Rick Overton as Slick (credited), the President of the United States (uncredited)
 Andrea Romano as President's Advisor
 Tara Strong as Alexa
 Bruce Timm as Attacker

Production
The film was originally advertised as having a storyline involving the Greek god Ares escaping Paradise Island in order to capture and control a mystic item called the Hand of Rage. He would then use the Hand of Rage to bring about World War III. This storyline was later dropped.

The film's casting director Andrea Romano explained that Keri Russell's casting as Wonder Woman was partly inspired by Romano seeing Russell's performance in the film Waitress.

According to producer Bruce Timm, during post-production, many action scenes had to be edited after the first cut of the film received an R rating from the MPAA.

Soundtrack

Promotion
DC Comics gave out promotional light-up tiaras to those who attended the premiere of the film at WonderCon 2009.

Upon the DVD release of the film, DC Comics arranged for several promotional packaging concepts to be released through different vendors. Working together with Mattel, they created a miniature action figure of the animated Wonder Woman that was packaged together with the 2-disc DVD sets sold through Best Buy's stores. Images of the animated Wonder Woman were made into sheets of temporary tattoos and packaged with the single disc DVD of the film that were sold exclusively through Kmart's stores. FYE and Suncoast retail stores sold pre-orders of the DVD with a promotional film poster containing a printed autograph of the film's director Lauren Montgomery. The two-disc special edition DVDs sold at Target stores included bonus Wonder Woman centric episodes from the Justice League animated series and its sequel Justice League Unlimited, two shows produced by Bruce Timm. Borders Book Stores offered an exclusive "Making of Wonder Woman" booklet featuring storyboards and character designs. Finally, a lenticular cover was created for the DVD cover depicting Wonder Woman shifting her position, sold exclusively through Wal-Mart stores.

Critical reception
From its previews at WonderCon and New York Comic Con to its DVD release Wonder Woman received mostly positive reviews. Harry Knowles gave a positive review of Wonder Woman on his website Ain't It Cool News. Knowles enthusiastically lauded director Montgomery and the surprising brutality of the action scenes. Jim Vejvoda of IGN praised the film's humor, action, and vocal performances, singling out the "perfectly cast" Fillion. Jordan Hoffman of UGO.com gave a positive review, commenting on the film's great dialogue and the mature use of post-feminist themes in relation to perceived chauvinism. Reviewing the film for Comic Book Resources, Josh Wigler gave a positive review, but criticized the unexplained inclusion of Diana's invisible plane. An explanation was left out as Timm and Montgomery felt it was too convoluted and merely pseudo-scientific. The World's Finest cited a few inconsistencies but said overall it was "easily the best DC Universe Animated Original Movie title to date."

The level of violence in the film – in one sequence, Steve Trevor is shown killing human adversaries while Wonder Woman uses extreme force, and several beheadings in battle also occur – garnered some criticism. Chris Mautner, reviewing the film for Comic Book Resources, remarked, "Is it just me or does it seem more than a bit...unnecessary?".

According to The-Numbers.com, Wonder Woman ranked No. 5 in DVD sales from its release of March 3 to 8, 2009. From the total units of 106,342, it made $2,040,703 in sales. The film has currently earned a total of $8,655,606 from domestic home video sales.

Novelization
An adaptation of the film, entitled simply Wonder Woman, was published in January 2009 by Pocket Star Books, an imprint of Simon & Schuster. Written by S.D. Perry and Britta Dennison, the book follows the film's plot faithfully, but it omits some of the incidental violence (Steve Trevor killing guards, for example) featured in the film.

Cancelled sequel 
Bruce Timm expressed interest in making a sequel of this film, like a sequel to Green Lantern: First Flight, but ultimately the project was cancelled due to the slower sales of the film.

References

External links

 
 
Wonder Woman at the Movie Review Query Engine
Wonder Woman at The World's Finest.

2009 animated films
2009 films
2009 direct-to-video films
Animated films based on DC Comics
Wonder Woman films
2000s English-language films
DC Universe Animated Original Movies
Animated films based on classical mythology
Films set on fictional islands
Films set in New York City
Films set in Washington, D.C.
Warner Bros. Animation animated films
2000s American animated films
2000s animated superhero films
2000s feminist films
Films directed by Lauren Montgomery
2009 fantasy films
American animated fantasy films
Animated superheroine films
Ares in popular culture
Hades